Kalman Konya (born 27 October 1961 in Zürich) is a retired Hungarian-West German shot putter.

He won the bronze medal at the 1989 Summer Universiade and finished ninth at the 1990 European Championships. He was qualified for the 1992 Olympic Games, but did not make an actual appearance. Konya represented the sports club Salamander Kornwestheim, and became German champion in 1990.

His personal best throw was 20.55 metres, achieved in July 1993 in Rüdlingen.

References

1961 births
Living people
Sportspeople from Zürich
West German male shot putters
German people of Hungarian descent
Athletes (track and field) at the 1992 Summer Olympics
Olympic athletes of Germany
Universiade medalists in athletics (track and field)
Universiade bronze medalists for West Germany
SV Salamander Kornwestheim athletes
Medalists at the 1989 Summer Universiade